Baron Frederick Augustus de Zeng (1756 in Dresden, Saxony – 26 April 1838 in Clyde, New York) was a Hessian mercenary who served in one of the regiments in the British service in the Thirteen Colonies during the American Revolution.  He remained after the fighting was over, was naturalized and pursued various businesses.

Biography
De Zeng received a military education. At the age of eighteen, he became lieutenant of the guard in the service of the landgrave of Hesse-Cassel. He saw service in Moravia and Bohemia, and in 1776 received the court appointment of gentleman of the chamber. He went to the Thirteen Colonies about the close of 1780 as captain of one of the Hessian regiments in the British service. He was honorably discharged from the German service in 1783, and in 1784 married and purchased an estate at Red Hook, New York. He was naturalized in 1789, and in 1792 commissioned major of a battalion of militia in Ulster County, New York, in which county he had become joint owner with Chancellor Livingston of a large tract of land. He was intimate with Gov. Clinton, interested like him in the opening of the interior water communications of the state, and personally surveyed in 1790-92 the entire country from Albany to the Genesee River.

De Zeng was associated with Gen. Schuyler in the Western Inland Lock Navigation Company, and in 1796 was one of three who established near Albany a manufactory of window glass, the first in the state. The enterprise proved a financial success until 1815, when it closed due to a shortage of fuel in the neighborhood. In 1812 he suggested measures that resulted in the improvement of the navigation of Seneca River and its associated lakes, and in 1814-15 began what ultimately became the Chemung Canal. He resided at Kingston, Ulster County, and later at Bainbridge, Chenango County, New York, where he built and owned the bridge over the Susquehanna River.

Notes

References
 

1756 births
1838 deaths
Personnel of German units of the American Revolutionary War
American businesspeople
German emigrants to the United States
Military personnel from Dresden
People from Red Hook, New York
People from Clyde, New York